"Rattle!" (stylized in capital letters) is a song performed by American contemporary worship band Elevation Worship. On April 23, 2021, it was released as the third single from their eighth live album, Graves into Gardens (2020), to Christian radio stations in the United States. The song was written by Brandon Lake, Chris Brown, and Steven Furtick. Chris Brown and Aaron Robertson handled the production of the single. 

"Rattle!" peaked at No. 4 on the US Hot Christian Songs chart, and No. 25 on the Bubbling Under Hot 100 chart. At the 2022 GMA Dove Awards, "Rattle!" was nominated for the GMA Dove Award for Song of the Year.

Background
"Rattle!" was initially released by Elevation Worship as a lyric video on YouTube on April 15, 2020. The song was officially released as the third promotional single of Graves into Gardens on April 24, after amassing on YouTube over 1.2 million views.

On July 10, 2020, Elevation Worship released a Spanish-language remake of the album Graves into Gardens, titled Tumbas a Jardines, which has a Spanish rendition of "Rattle!" titled "Ruido!". On January 8, 2021, Elevation Worship released the album, Graves into Gardens: Morning & Evening which included a new rendition of the song, "Rattle! (Morning & Evening)". The song impacted Christian radio stations on April 23, 2021.

Writing and development
In an interview with Billboard, Chris Brown shared the story behind the song, saying:

Composition

Accolades

Commercial performance
"Rattle!" debuted at number seventeen on the US Hot Christian Songs chart dated May 9, 2020, concurrently charting at No. 1 on the Christian Digital Song Sales chart. Following the release of Graves into Gardens, the song reached at number sixteen on the Hot Christian Songs May 16-dated chart. The song spent a total of twenty one weeks appearing on the chart.

"Rattle!" returned to Hot Christian Songs chart dated on June 12, 2021, at number sixteen.

"Rattle!" rose to No. 1 on the Christian Airplay chart dated September 18, 2021.

Music videos
On April 15, 2020, Elevation Worship released the lyric video of "Rattle!" recorded at Elevation Church's Ballantyne campus on their YouTube channel, The acoustic performance video of the song was published on YouTube by Elevation Worship on June 22, 2020. Elevation Worship availed a Spanish rendition of the song, titled "Ruido!" on their YouTube channel on July 10, 2020. Elevation Worship released the music video for "Rattle! (Morning & Evening)" on YouTube on January 8, 2021.

Charts

Weekly charts

Year-end charts

Release history

Zach Williams, Essential Worship version

On November 13, 2020, Zach Williams and Essential Worship released a cover of the song featuring the vocals of Steven Furtick, as a standalone single.

Background
Zach Williams shared the story behind the recording this version of the song, saying:

Composition

Commercial performance
Zach Williams' and Essential Worship's rendition of the song made its debut at number 50 on Billboard's Hot Christian Songs chart dated January 16, 2021.

Music video
On November 12, 2020, Essential Worship published the lyric video of the song on YouTube.

Charts

Release history

Other versions
 Brandon Lake released his own rendition of "Rattle!" featuring Tasha Cobbs Leonard on his second studio album, House of Miracles (2020).

References

External links
 

2020 songs
Elevation Worship songs
Songs written by Brandon Lake
Songs written by Steven Furtick